Cremenciug is a commune in Soroca District, Moldova. It is composed of four villages: Cremenciug, Livezi, Sobari and Valea.

References

Communes of Soroca District